The 2012 African Fencing Championships were held in Casablanca, Morocco from 20 to 25 April.

Medal summary

Men's events

Women's events
Two nations only, Egypt and Algeria, entered a team in women's foil.

Medal table

References
 Annual Report 2011–12 of the International Fencing Federation

2012
African Fencing Championships
International fencing competitions hosted by Morocco
2012 in Moroccan sport